Meristocotylidae is a family of trematodes belonging to the order Plagiorchiida.

Genera:
 Meristocotyle Fischthal & Kuntz, 1964

References

Plagiorchiida